Omega Psi Phi Fraternity, Inc. is a historically African-American fraternity. The fraternity was founded on November 17, 1911, the first at a historically black university, by three Howard University students, Edgar Amos Love, Oscar James Cooper and Frank Coleman, and their faculty adviser, Dr. Ernest Everett Just. Since its founding the organization has chartered over 750 undergraduate and graduate chapters.

History

Since its founding in 1911, Omega Psi Phi's stated purpose has been "to attract and build a strong and effective force of Handsome men dedicated to its Cardinal Principles of manhood, scholarship, perseverance, and uplift". Throughout the world, many notable members are recognized as leaders in the arts, academics, athletics, entertainment, business, civil rights, education, government, and science fields. A few notable members include Samuel M. Nabrit, Walter E. Massey, Benjamin Mays, Bayard Rustin, Langston Hughes, Count Basie, Roy Wilkins, Benjamin Hooks, Vernon Jordan, Robert Henry Lawrence, Jr., Malcolm Jenkins, State Senator Isadore Hall III, Martin Luther King Sr., Rev. Jesse Jackson, William H. Hastie (U.S. Virgin Islands) and L. Douglas Wilder, Representative James Clyburn, Earl Graves, Tom Joyner, Charles Bolden, Ronald McNair, Bill Cosby, General William "Kip" Ward, Michael Jordan, Ovince Saint Preux, Shaquille O'Neal, Roger Kingdom, Terrence Trammell, Shammond Williams, Vince Carter, Steve Harvey, Rickey Smiley, Ray Lewis, Stephen A. Smith, Jalen Hurts, James DuBose, George Clinton, Kevon Williams, DeHart Hubbard, and numerous presidents of colleges and universities. Among the 2013 Super Bowl champion Baltimore Ravens, six players and GM Ozzie Newsome are also members/brothers of the fraternity. Over 250,000 men have been initiated into Omega Psi Phi throughout the United States, Bermuda, Bahamas, Virgin Islands, South Korea, Japan, Liberia, Germany, and Kuwait. The fraternity was incorporated under the laws of Washington D.C. on October 28, 1914.

In 1924, at the urging of fraternity member Carter G. Woodson, the fraternity launched Negro History and Literature Week in an effort to publicize the growing body of scholarship on African-American history. Encouraged by public interest, the event was renamed "Negro Achievement Week" in 1925 and given an expanded national presence in 1926 by Woodson's Association for the Study of Negro Life and History as "Negro History Week." Expanded to the full month of February from 1976, this event continues today as Black History Month.

Since 1945, the fraternity has undertaken a National Social Action Program to meet the needs of African Americans in the areas of health, housing, civil rights, and education. Omega Psi Phi has been a patron of the United Negro College Fund (UNCF) since 1955, providing an annual gift of $50,000.00 to the program.

Omega Psi Phi is a founding member of the National Pan-Hellenic Council (NPHC), which is composed of nine historically African-American Greek-letter sororities and fraternities that promote interaction through forums, meetings, and other media for the exchange of information, and engage in cooperative programming and initiatives throughout the world. The (NPHC) currently represents over 2.5 million members.

Centennial Celebration

Omega Psi Phi celebrated its centennial during the week of July 27–31, 2011 in Washington, D.C., becoming distinguished as only the third African American collegiate fraternity to reach the century mark. The Centennial Celebration recognized the impact of the Fraternity in communities over the past 100 years, honored Omega Men for achievement in all walks of life, reiterated Omega Psi Phi's commitment to providing unparalleled community service and scholarship, and charted the Fraternity's future activities.

Internationally Mandated Programs
Each Chapter administers Internationally Mandated Programs every year:

Achievement Week – A week in November that seeks to recognize individuals who have made notable contributions to society. During the Achievement Week, a High School Essay Contest is held and the winner usually receives a scholarship award.

Scholarship – The Charles R. Drew Scholarship Program encourages academic progress among the organization's undergraduate members. A portion of the fraternity's budget is designated for the Charles R. Drew Scholarship Commission, which awards scholarships to members and non-members.

Social Action Programs – All chapters are required to participate in programs that uplift their society. Many participate in activities like: voter registration, illiteracy programs, mentoring programs, fundraisers, and charitable organizations such as American Diabetes Association, United Way, and the Sickle Cell Anemia Foundation.

Talent Hunt Program – Each chapter is required to hold a yearly talent contest, to encourage young people to expose themselves to the Performing Arts. Individuals who win these talent contests receive an award, such as a scholarship.

Memorial Service – March 12 is Omega Psi Phi Memorial Day. Every chapter of the Fraternity performs a ritualistic memorial service to remember members who have died.

Reclamation and Retention – This program is an effort to encourage inactive members to become fully active and participate in the fraternity's programs.

College Endowment Funds – The fraternity donates thousands of dollars to Historically Black Colleges and Universities each year.

Health Initiatives – Chapters are required to coordinate programs that will encourage good health practices. Programs that members involve themselves in include HIV/AIDS awareness, blood drives, prostate cancer awareness, and sickle cell anemia awareness programs.

Voter Registration, Education and Motivation – Coordination activities that promote voter registration and mobilization.

NAACP – A Life Membership at Large in the NAACP is required by all chapters and districts.

Membership

Omega Psi Phi recognizes undergraduate and graduate membership. College students must be working toward a bachelor's degree at a four-year institution, have at least 31 semester credits, and maintain at least a 2.5 grade point average. For the graduate chapter, an applicant must already possess a bachelor's degree. The fraternity grants honorary membership to men who have contributed to society in a positive way on a national or international level. For example, Charles Young (March 12, 1864 – January 2, 1922) was the third African American graduate of West Point, the first black U.S. national park superintendent, the first African American military attaché, and the highest ranking black officer (Colonel) in the United States Army until his death in 1922.

National Pan-Hellenic Council membership

In 1930, Omega Psi Phi became one of 5 founding members of the National Pan-Hellenic Council (NPHC). Today, the NPHC is composed of nine international black Greek-letter sororities and fraternities and promotes interaction through forums, meetings, and other mediums for the exchange of information, and engages in cooperative programming and initiatives through various activities and functions.

Grand Basileus

a. Finished unexpired term of Atkins

List of Omega Psi Phi Grand Conclaves

"Unofficial" practices
Like many fraternal organizations, Omega Psi Phi has a rich tradition of practices.  While some traditions are naturally secret, many are freely expressed in public.  A popular one is referring to members as "Que Dogs" or "Ques" (pronounced , like the letter Q).  Another is the practice of members voluntarily undergoing branding of the letters, or variations and designs based on them (such as two linked Omega symbols), on their skin.  The brands often are displayed in public as a matter of pride; some prospects first learn of the fraternity by seeing members bearing brands.

Incidents and controversies
In 1977, Robert Brazile, a student at the University of Pennsylvania, collapsed and died at a fraternity house meeting due to injuries and beatings he sustained while pledging the fraternity.

In 1978, Nathaniel Swimson, a student at North Carolina Central University, died during an off-campus initiation activity.  He was asked to run several miles before he collapsed and died.

In 1983, Vann Watts, a student at Tennessee State University, died of an alcohol overdose following an initiation party.  It was reported that prior to his death, he was severely beaten and verbally abused by fraternity members.

In 1984, a Hampton University student was killed participating in an Omega Psi Phi ritual. The family of the deceased student privately settled with the fraternity for an undisclosed amount as a result of his wrongful death.

In 1986, Thomas Harold, a student at Lamar University, died as a result of running miles on Lamar's track as part of a pledging task.

In 1997, the fraternity was court ordered to pay a former Indiana University pledge $774,500 for injuries he sustained while pledging in 1994.

In 1999, Omega Psi Phi was court ordered to pay a former University of Louisville student nearly $1 million for suffering kidney failure due to hazing activity in 1997.

In 2001, Joseph T. Green, a student at Tennessee State University, died as result of an asthma attack he developed from being asked to run long distances while pledging. In 2002, his family filed a $15 million wrongful death lawsuit against the men of Omega Psi Phi Incorporated.

In 2009, a former pledge at the University of Houston settled with the fraternity for an undisclosed amount after being hit with a baseball bat, wood board, and TV antenna while pledging.  The UH student wanted to join the fraternity because his father was a member. The chapter was placed on suspension following this incident.

In 2014, the chapter at Valdosta State University was banned from campus until at least August 2022 due to severe hazing and violating the school's code of conduct.

In 2015, six Omega Psi Phi members at Johnson C. Smith University were arrested and charged with assault for severely beating pledges over a two-month span.

In 2015, four Omega Psi Phi members at Saginaw Valley State University were arrested and charged for striking pledges with open hands and paddles.  One known pledge sustained a serious injury after losing consciousness one night pledging.

In 2015, a Florida Atlantic University student reported to the police she was gang-raped at an Omega Psi Phi "Oil Spill" step show afterparty.  Inside the party, she stated she was suddenly and forcefully pulled behind curtains and raped by a group of men in a dark area.

In 2016, the fraternity at Florida State University was suspended for severely abusing pledges and violating the university's code of conduct. Criminal charges were pending for members of the fraternity.

On August 28, 2016, two Ithaca College students were stabbed (one fatally) as they got into a fight as they left a Omega Psi Phi party held at Willard Straight Hall of Cornell University.

In April 2017, Omega Psi Phi member and alleged spree killer, Steve Stephens, referred to the fraternity multiple times in videos he posted during his killing spree. Stephens claimed that he was going to shoot "Greeks" in the head until he was caught.

In 2018, a fraternity member and accountant at the fraternity headquarters in Georgia blew the whistle in regards to concerning embezzlement allegations among fraternity leadership.  As part of his accountant duties, he reported his embezzlement findings to his fraternity's 24-membered board of directors and was suspended.

In 2019, national leadership of Omega Psi Phi, Inc., halted all new membership initiation activity when Georgia Tech football player Brandon Adams died during a fraternity event.  During step practice for pledges at a townhome near campus, Adams collapsed and was taken to a local hospital where he was pronounced dead.

In 2023, three Memphis officers that were members of the fraternity had their memberships permanently revoked due to their involvement with the killing of Tyre Nichols.  A picture went viral on social media of one of the officers wearing an Omega Psi Phi wristband doing the killing which sparked outrage from many black activists and prompted an official response from the fraternity.

See also

List of social fraternities and sororities

References

Further reading

External links
 

 
1911 establishments in Washington, D.C.
International student societies
National Pan-Hellenic Council
Student organizations established in 1911
Student societies in the United States